Gino Vries (born 10 April 1987) is a South African first-class cricketer who plays for Free State.

References

External links
 

1987 births
Living people
South African cricketers
Free State cricketers
Cricketers from Bloemfontein